Charles Partridge (1867 – after 1898) was an English professional footballer who made 29 appearances in the Football League for Small Heath. He played as a goalkeeper.

Partridge was born in Wednesbury, Staffordshire. He played football for Wednesbury Old Athletic before joining Small Heath in 1890. He played two games in Small Heath's second season in the Football Alliance, as a replacement for Chris Charsley and once in their second season in the Football League, replacing George Hollis. In the 1894–95 season, the club's first in the First Division, Partridge was first-choice goalkeeper, and had the dubious honour of being in goal for the club's record defeat, 9–1, away to Blackburn Rovers in January 1895. He lost his place the following season to Jim Roach, and went on to play for a variety of clubs in the Black Country, Birmingham and north Worcestershire.

References

1867 births
Year of death missing
Sportspeople from Wednesbury
English footballers
Association football goalkeepers
Wednesbury Old Athletic F.C. players
Birmingham City F.C. players
Willenhall F.C. players
Redditch United F.C. players
Football Alliance players
English Football League players
Date of birth missing
Place of death missing